South Central Trains may refer to one of the following organisations that has operated the South Central franchise in England:

Network SouthCentral
Connex South Central
Southern (train operating company)